Lawrence Institute may refer to:

Lawrence Technological University, Michigan
Lawrence University, Wisconsin
Lawrence Livermore National Laboratory, Livermore, California
Lawrence Hall of Science, Berkeley, California
Lawrence Institute, the original name of the Delhi Town Hall, India

See also
St. Lawrence Institute, a former building of the College of North West London
Andrea Lawrence Institute for Mountains and Rivers, founded by Andrea Mead Lawrence